Cuba is an unincorporated community in western Washington Township, Clinton County, Ohio, United States.  It has a post office with the ZIP code 45114.  It lies at the intersection of U.S. Route 68 with State Route 350. In addition to the post office, the community is home to the Cuba Friends Meeting, a part of the Wilmington Yearly Meeting of the Society of Friends.

History
Cuba was platted in 1814. The origin of the name Cuba is obscure. A post office called Cuba has been in operation since 1826.

Gallery

References

Unincorporated communities in Ohio
Unincorporated communities in Clinton County, Ohio